Garcinia dulcis is a tropical fruit tree native to the Philippines, Java, Lesser Sunda Islands, eastern Indonesia (Sulawesi, Kalimantan, and the Maluku Islands), and Papua New Guinea. It was domesticated early and spread inland into mainland Asia. It is commonly known as mundu or munu in Indonesia and Malaysia, baniti or taklang-anak in the Philippines, and maphuut or ma phut in Thailand.

The tree is harvested from the wild as a local source of food, medicine or dyeing material and is sometimes cultivated for its fruit, which is occasionally sold locally. Garcinia dulcis is not grown commercially.

Description
Garcinia dulcis is an evergreen tree with horizontal branches and a dense, pyramidal crown. It can grow up to 15 metres tall and has a short, straight trunk, which can develop to a size of 30 cm in diameter. The tree grows best in areas where annual daytime temperatures are within the range of 22–30 °C and is well adapted to shade and humid conditions. Flowering usually occurs twice a year after long periods of drought.

Uses
The orange coloured fruits can be eaten fresh; they contain a sour, juicy pulp, which can be preserved into jam. Green dye can be obtained from the bark, when mixed with indigo it gives a brown colour which is used to dye mats. From the unripe fruits a yellow dye, called gamboge, can be extracted, but is considered inferior to other dyes from members of the same genus like Garcinia xanthochymus. Garcinia dulcis also has medicanal purposes; it can be used for the treatment of wounds or scurvy.

See also
Garcinia binucao
Garcinia gummi-gutta
Garcinia morella

References

dulcis

Flora of Myanmar
Flora of Peninsular Malaysia
Flora of the Maluku Islands
Flora of Sulawesi
Flora of the Philippines
Flora of New Guinea
Flora of Queensland
Flora of the Andaman Islands
Flora of the Nicobar Islands